The 1989 Virginia Slims of Florida was a women's tennis tournament played on outdoor hard courts at the Polo Club of Boca Raton in Boca Raton, Florida in the United States and was part of the Category 5 tier of the 1989 WTA Tour. The tournament ran from March 13 through March 19, 1989. First-seeded Steffi Graf won the singles title, her second at the event after 1987.

Finals

Singles

 Steffi Graf defeated  Chris Evert 4–6, 6–2, 6–3
 It was Graf's 4th singles title of the year and the 34th of her career.

Doubles

 Jana Novotná /  Helena Suková defeated  Jo Durie /  Mary Joe Fernández 6–4, 6–2
 It was Novotná's 3rd title of the year and the 15th of her career. It was Suková's 3rd title of the year and the 35th of her career.

References

External links
 ITF tournament edition details
 Tournament draws
 Tournament fact sheet

Virginia Slims of Florida
Virginia Slims of Florida
Virginia Slims of Florida
Virginia Slims of Florida
Virginia Slims of Florida